Ancharius, the Vaonas, is a small genus of catfishes (order Siluriformes) of the family Anchariidae.

Ancharius has been variably placed in Mochokidae, Ariidae, and Anchariidae. They are endemic to Madagascar.

Species 
This genus currently contain two described species:
 Ancharius fuscus Steindachner, 1880
 Ancharius griseus H. H. Ng & Sparks, 2005

References

 
Endemic fauna of Madagascar
Anchariidae
Catfish genera
Taxa named by Franz Steindachner
Freshwater fish genera